Heng Samrin (born 25 May 1934) is a Cambodian politician who serves as the President of the National Assembly of Cambodia. Between 1979 and 1992, he was the de facto leader of the Hanoi-backed People's Republic of Kampuchea (1979–1989) and State of Cambodia (1989–1992) and General Secretary of the Kampuchean People's Revolutionary Party from 1981 to 1991. 

He has been a member of Parliament since 1993. He is the oldest member of parliament, and the longest-serving president of the National Assembly in history. His honorary title is "Samdech Akka Moha Ponhea Chakrei Heng Samrin".

Life and career
Heng Samrin was born in Kampong Cham Province, Cambodia, in 1934. He joined the Khmer Rouge communist movement led by Pol Pot, and became a political commissar and army division commander when the Khmer Rouge, backed by China, took over the government in 1975. In 1978, after a series of violent purges within the Khmer Rouge leadership in which many prominent cadre members whom Pol Pot felt might be rivals were executed, he fled to Vietnam. 

In Vietnam he was one of the founding members of the Kampuchean United Front for National Salvation (FUNSK). Later that year, Heng returned to Cambodia and organized a resistance movement with the backing and support of Vietnam and the Soviet Union.

After a Vietnamese invasion of Cambodia overthrew the Khmer Rouge in 1979, Vietnamese occupation authorities established the People's Republic of Kampuchea, installing Heng and other pro-Vietnamese Communist politicians as leaders of the new government. He became chairman of the People's Revolutionary Council of the PRK in 1979. In 1981 he became chairman of the Council of State and secretary-general of the People's Revolutionary Party. Though at first he was the effective leader of the government, he lost much of his political power when Hun Sen became Prime Minister of Cambodia in 1985.

As Vietnamese influence declined, Samrin gradually lost his posts, including the post of secretary-general in 1991 and chairman of the council of state in 1992. When King Norodom Sihanouk was restored in 1993, Samrin was given the honorary title of Sâmdech, senior advisor of the King, and was made honorary chairman of Hun Sen's Cambodian People's Party. He was vice chairman of the National Assembly of Cambodia (1998–2006). Since 2006, he has acted as Chairman of the Solidarity Front for Development of the Cambodian Motherland.

The Cambodian People's Party recently released a book about Samrin called A Man of the People, dedicated to him as a hero. According to that book, among supporters of the ruling CPP Heng Samrin is a "much loved and respected figure", even though his recent duties are often largely ceremonial. His full title is Samdach Akeak Moha Ponhea Chakrei Heng Samrin, Protean Radhsaphea ney Preah Reacheanachak Kampuchea (Khmer: សម្តេចអគ្គមហាពញាចក្រី ហេង សំរិន ប្រធានរដ្ឋសភា នៃព្រះរាជាណាចក្រកម្ពុជា).

See also
People's Republic of Kampuchea

References

External links
http://www.seasite.niu.edu/khmer/Ledgerwood/biographies.htm

|-

|-

|-

|-

 

Presidents of the National Assembly (Cambodia)
1934 births
20th-century Cambodian politicians
21st-century Cambodian politicians
Living people
People's Republic of Kampuchea
Kampuchean United Front for National Salvation politicians
Communist Party of Kampuchea politicians
Cambodian People's Party politicians
Heads of state of Cambodia
Cambodian communists
Cambodian revolutionaries
Cambodian Theravada Buddhists
People from Kampong Cham province
People from Tboung Khmum province